The 2010–11 season was Melbourne Victory's sixth season in the Hyundai A-League. It was the first A-League season with two teams from the same city, after the introduction of Melbourne Heart.

Season summary
The 2010–11 season was Melbourne Victory's sixth in the A-League. It was the first A-League season with a second club from Victoria (Melbourne Heart). This hoped to create a Melbourne derby more fierce than those with Sydney FC and Adelaide United. The rivalry reached a new level when Victory skipper Kevin Muscat was red carded for an unacceptable tackle on young Heart player Adrian Zahra. Victory moved their home games to AAMI Park for regular season matches.
Melbourne Victory started their pre-season by signing former Socceroos keeper Michael Petkovic from Sivasspor, promoted Diogo Ferreira, Petar Franjic and Sebastian Mattei from the youth team and with Archie Thompson sidelined with a long term injury, Ricardinho was officially unveiled as Melbourne Victory's international marquee player from Oeste Futebol Clube, where he signed a two-year deal and was handed the number 9 shirt. Victory also loaned Geoff Kellaway from Victorian Premier League Premier Dandenong Thunder. On 24 December 2010, Daniel Allsopp rejoined Victory after a year with Al-Rayyan Sports Club and D.C. United.

Meanwhile, promising goalkeeper Mitch Langerak was transferred to Borussia Dortmund after his impressive 2010 AFC Champions League performance. goalkeeper Glen Moss was also transferred to Gold Coast United and attacking midfielder Nick Ward to Wellington Phoenix. Nathan Elasi was released to Bonnyrigg White Eagles and Mathew Theodore was released to Dandenong Thunder.

2010–11 saw Melbourne Victory finish in fifth place in the regular season and qualify for the finals to face fourth placed Gold Coast United in the first week knockout stage. On 20 February 2011, Gold Coast United's Dino Djulbic 90+1 header bundled Melbourne Victory out of the championship race with a stunning 1–0 win in sweltering conditions at Skilled Park.

Melbourne Victory were drawn into Group E in the 2011 AFC Champions League along with Jeju United, Gamba Osaka and sister city team Tianjin Teda. Isaka Cernak had been signed from North Queensland Fury for the 2011 AFC Champions League and the following season.

Towards the end of the 2010–11 A-League season was preceded by major changes at the club, not only in the playing group but also on the board. Inaugural chairman Geoff Lord stepped down and was replaced by Anthony Di Pietro. This led to a changing of the coaching staff. On 12 March 2011, Ernie Merrick came to an agreement with the board of directors to part company with the club after being publicly criticised by fans and media for the club's poor 2010–11 season performance, especially the 4–1 loss to arch rival Adelaide United, and the 5–1 loss to Gamba Osaka in its opening 2011 AFC Champions League game. Youth team head coach and former Socceroo Mehmet Durakovic was then appointed as caretaker manager for the remaining 2011 AFC Champions League competition. Merrick's sacking was followed by that of former Socceroos striker Gary Cole on 12 April 2011 as Football Operation Manager after six years of service. Assistant coach Aaron Healey joined the casualty list of the post-Merrick era the following week, as the club sought to reinvent itself as the pre-eminent football force in Australia. Captain Kevin Muscat announced his retirement after the 2011 AFC Champions League.

Many changes were made to the playing group in the off-season. The club announced on 8 February 2011 that they had signed Perth Glory goalkeeper Tando Velaphi on a two-year deal. On 28 February 2011, it was announced that Mate Dugandžić strengthened the rivalry between the two Melbourne clubs by signing for cross town rival Melbourne Heart and became the first player transferred directly from Victory to Heart. Aziz Behich and Kristian Sarkies were the first two players to play for both teams but not transferred directly as Aziz Behich played for Hume City FC after Victory and before Heart during the A-League off-season while Kristian Sarkies transferred via Adelaide United. The club ended weeks of speculation on 11 March 2011 by officially confirming that they had signed attacking midfielder Marco Rojas for the upcoming season, securing him on a two-year deal. Ricardinho was not selected as one of the five foreign imports for Melbourne's 2011 AFC Champions League campaign, and as a result was loaned to Campeonato Brasileiro Série B club Paraná Clube until 31 December 2011. On 26 March 2011, Socceroos striker Robbie Kruse announced he had signed with 2. Bundesliga  side Fortuna Düsseldorf on a three-year contract beginning with the 2011–12 season. The club announced the signing of Jean Carlos Solorzano from Brisbane Roar on 28 March 2011, with L.D. Alajuelense extending his loan deal for one more season so that the move could take place.

Players

First team squad

Transfers

Winter

In

Out

Summer

In

Out

Managerial and captain changes

Matches

2010–11 Pre-season friendlies

2010–11 Hyundai A-League fixtures

Notes

2010–11 Finals series

Statistics

Leading scorers

Discipline 
Updated as end of the season

2011 AFC Champions League

Group stage

References

External links 
 Official website
 A-League website
 Melbourne Victory Videos

2009-10
2010–11 A-League season by team